The Aqaba Thermal Power Station is the largest power station in Jordan. It has a total generation capacity of 656 MW, which consists of five steam turbines units (5 x 130 MW), and two hydraulic turbines (2 x 3 MW). The power station is fueled by natural gas and by fuel oil.  It is operated by the Central Electricity Generating Company of Jordan.

The Aqaba Thermal Power Station was established in 1986 as an oil-fueled power station.  After construction of the Arab Gas Pipeline, the power station was switched to use natural gas.

References

Aqaba
Oil-fired power stations in Jordan
Natural gas-fired power stations in Jordan